Yuldashevo (Yuldaş) is a rural locality (a village) in Gusevsky Selsoviet, Abzelilovsky District, Bashkortostan, Russia. The population was 340 as of 2010. There are 5 streets.

Geography 
Yuldashevo is located 14 km southeast of Askarovo (the district's administrative centre) by road. Askarovo is the nearest rural locality.

References 

Rural localities in Abzelilovsky District